63rd Street station may refer to:

63rd Street station (SEPTA Market–Frankford Line), a SEPTA rapid transit station in Philadelphia
63rd Street station (SEPTA Route 15), a SEPTA trolley stop in Philadelphia
63rd Street and Malvern Avenue station, a SEPTA trolley stop in Philadelphia
63rd Street station (Metra), a Metra station in Chicago
Ashland/63rd station, Green Line, Chicago
63rd station, Red Line, Chicago
Lexington Avenue–63rd Street station in the New York City Subway

See also
63rd Street (disambiguation)